Chi Qiang (born 26 December 1975) is a Chinese competitive sailor who competed in the 2004 Summer Olympics.

References

1975 births
Living people
Olympic sailors of China
Chinese male sailors (sport)
Sailors at the 2004 Summer Olympics – Laser
Sportspeople from Shanghai
21st-century Chinese people